Margaret Leroy is a British romantic novelist. Her 1999 novel Trust was adapted for a British television film with a screenplay by Matthew Hall as Loving You in 2003.

She was brought up in the New Forest and studied music at St Hilda's College, Oxford.

Her subsequent novels include:
The River House (2005)
Yes, My Darling Daughter (2009)
The Soldier's Wife (2011)
A Brief Affair (2015)

References

External links
 Official website

Alumni of St Hilda's College, Oxford
Living people
Year of birth missing (living people)
British romantic fiction writers